Gowdah Kahriz (also Romanized as Gowdah Kahrīz and Gūdah Kahrīz) is a village in Angut-e Gharbi Rural District, Anguti District, Germi County, Ardabil Province, Iran. At the 2006 census, its population was 382, in 75 families.

References 

Tageo

Towns and villages in Germi County